(IIJ) was founded in 1992 by Koichi Suzuki, as Japan’s first Internet service provider (ISP).

From 1999 IIJ were listed on NASDAQ, USA (listed August 1999; ticker symbol IIJI) and as of 2006 were listed on the First Section of the Tokyo Stock Exchange (listed December 2006; stock ticker number: 3774).

References

External links

Internet in Japan
Internet service providers of Japan
Companies formerly listed on the Nasdaq
Companies listed on the Tokyo Stock Exchange
Telecommunications companies established in 1992
Domain name registrars
Mobile virtual network operators
Internet properties established in 1992
Japanese companies established in 1992